Tarbha (also known as Tarabha,  sometimes called "Ulta Bharat" or Opposite India) is a Notified Area Council in Sonepur district in the Indian state of Odisha.

History 
The name Tarbha apparently came from Tera Bhaya (तेराह भेया), or 13 brothers. In the Gauntia (ଗଁତିଆ) (The Village Head) system thirteen brothers were the Gauntia (Village Heads) of this small town. Later on this village was named Terabhaya and then modified to Tarbha (Official)/Tarabha/Tarva. The River Nibruti (ନିବୃତି) passes by one side of town, separating its two districts, Bolangir and Sonepur. Many residents participated in the Indian Freedom Movement.

Demography 
 India census, Tarbha had a population of 12,886. Males constitute 51% of the population. Tarbha has an average literacy rate of 68%, higher than the national average of 59.5%: male literacy is 78% and female literacy is 58%. 12% are under 6.
Tarbha is a Block, Police Station, Tahashil, Panchayat and NAC.

Economy 
The town hosts a mixture of castes, with the majority working as goldsmiths, brassmiths and weavers. The majority are either service holders or businessmen. Most businessmen here are either Marwari or Weavers. Meher constitute the majority of Weavers people.

A market complex is organised every Sunday and a daily market provides the people with their daily food. The market is popularly known as Tarbha Hat.

Education 

A.E.S. College provides science and arts education. The most influential institute is the Jawahar Navodaya Vidyalaya, which is situated in the middle of town providing National Level studies to JNV-Entrance selected students. It provides education from 6th to 10th. Saraswati Sishu Vidya Mandir provides up to 10th. Two High Schools (one each for boys and girls), one English Medium School, 8 U.P. Schools.

Educational institutes 
 Colleges
  A.E.S. College, Tarbha (Provides +2 (Both Science and Arts) and +3 (Both Science and Arts))
 ANANYA CET., TARBHA, Nuapada, Tarbha (Provides DCA, PGDCA, ADCA, BCA, +2 SCIENCE COACHING, OS-CIT, KLIC COURSES)

 Computer Educational Institute
ITCT Computer Education Center,Tarbha 
Provides PGDCA, ADCA, DCA, MS- OFFICE, TALLY, INTERNET (Under Ministry of Corporate Affairs, Govt. of India) & 
OS-CIT, OS-CIT'A', OS-CIT'A+' & 200+ OCOC COURSES (Under Odisha State Open University, Sambalpur)

High Schools
  Govt. Boys High School, Tarbha (Hub for 6th to 10th Std. for Boy Scholars)
  Govt. Girls High School, Tarbha (Hub for 6th to 10th Std. for Girl Scholars)
  Jawahar Navodaya Vidyalaya, Tarbha (One of the Leading Schools in the Districts)
  Saraswati Sishu Vidya Mandir, Antarda, Tarbha (Provides Quality Education for 6th to 10th Std. Students)
  Shri Hari Vidyapeeth, Tarbha (Oriya medium residential school)

English Medium Schools
  Shri Hari Vidyaniketan, Tarbha
  Reem Jhim Pre-school, Tarbha

Upper Primary Schools
  Govt. U.P. School, Kumbharpara
  Block U.P. School, Hatpada
  Pournamasi U.P. School, Pournamasipara
  Govt. U.P. School, Nuapara
  Shiv Shankar U.P. School, Shiv Shankar Para
  Govt. Girl's U.P. School, Rathapara
  Garhbhitar Govt. U.P. School, Bandhpara

 Special School
 Blind Deaf-Dumb school, main road (web site: www.bddstarbha.net63.net)

Culture 

Tarbha is a sacred place for Muslims, however the majority are Hindus. All festivals are celebrated in a grand way. The Tarbha Rath Yatra is very important in the locality. Celebrants pull the chariot of Lord Jagannath from Rathapara to Durgamandap, a distance of nearly 1 km. The annual festival is Nuakhai Parab, which is observed on the next day to Sri Ganesh Chaturthhi.

Tarbha hosts more than twenty temples.

The club culture (in which local youth voluntarily work for the people) that is disappearing from many villages is still powerful in Tarbha. Friend's Recreational Cultural Center (FRCC, Durgamandap), Nabajyoti Club (Rathapara), Bapuji Club (Bandhapara), Geetha Pathagar (Malipara) contribute.

Food 
Rice is the main component of the diet. Mudhi (Puffed Rice) and Snacks like Samosa, Vada, are commonly consumed. Tarbha is also famous for its few type of snack called Chaka Pitha (made of rice and Potato with several spices) and Chaul Bara (Rice Pakoda). The recipe of Chaul Bara is spread to many places but Chaka Pitha is the uniqueness of Tarbha till now.

Religion

Hinduism 
Tarbha is a holy place for both Hindus and Muslims. People from all religions celebrate their festival peacefully. The major festivals being organized here are Nuakhai, Ratha Yatra (Very famous in the locality), Durga Puja, Ganesh Puja, Vishwakarma Puja.

In the Shravan Month according to the Hindu Calendar, Many "Bolbam Bhaktas" come to the Lord Shiv Temple in order to fulfill their dreams.

Islam 
Tarbha is one of the few places in India where Hindus and Muslims enjoys all festivals together irrespective of religion. All the people are in harmony with each other.

Fakir Baba 

Fakir Baba, popularly known as Tarbhawale Baba, came to Tarbha as a preacher. He was born to a Muslim family on 20 June 1831 in Kandhar, the capital of Afghanistan. His Islamic name was Aulade Ghause Azam Allajush Saha Sayad Abdul Sakkur Khan Rehmattullla Alleh. After coming to Tarbha the people called him Fakir Baba or Tarbhawale Baba. He was known for his charitable works. He died on 16 March 1984 10:05 PM at the age of 154. In his memory there is a Dargah, named Ziarat Dargah in Tarbha. So Tarbha is also known as Tarbha Sharif. Every year Lakhs of Muslims come to Tarbha to receive his heavenly blessing.

Christianity 
Since last few years, some of the citizens have joined the Christian community. Recently, a church is created at Oriya Pada as the number of followers of Christianity have been increasing.

Religious venues 
 Hindus
Lord Jagannath Temple, Rathapada
Lord Nilakantheswar Temple, Shiv Shankar Pada
Lord Dhawaleswar Temple, Bandhpada
Lord Nrusingha Temple, Telipada
Lord Hanumaan Temple, Nuapada
Nitai Gauranga Temple, Nuapada
Shree Radha Krishna Temple, Daily Market
 Goddess Maa Bairasarani, Off NH 57, Near Namaste Gate, Tarbha
Laxmi Narayan Temple, Meherpada
Maa Pataneswari Temple, Rathapada
Balunkeswar Temple, Malipada
Shitla Mata Mandir
 Muslims
Mosque and Zariat Dargah, Hatpada

References

Cities and towns in Subarnapur district